The Pamenar Mosque, Sabzevar dates from the Safavid dynasty and is located in Sabzevar.

References

Mosques in Iran
Mosque buildings with domes
National works of Iran
Tourist attractions in Razavi Khorasan Province